The bibliography of Vyacheslav Shishkov (1873-1946) includes three novels, four novellas, eleven plays, a large number of short stories and several works of non-fiction.

Notable works by Vyacheslav Shishkov

Novels and novellas

Short stories 
{| class="wikitable"
|-
! Title 
! Year of publication
! Original title
! Notes
|-
|Cedar
|1908  
|Кедр  
|Symbolic fairytale. Sibirskaya Zhizn. Dedicated to his gymnasium teacher Vyatkin
|-
|And So They Prayed
|1912  
|Помолились  
|Zavety magazine, Moscow, February 1912 edition. Included into the Novosibgiz 1938 Blizzard collection  
|-
|Cold Country
|1912  
|Холодный край  
|Sibirskaya Zhizn, 4 November 1912, as "Na Severe" (Up North). Krasnaya Niva magazine, April 1923 issue, as "Cold Country"
|-
|Charms of Spring
|1912  
|Чары весны  
|Zhizn Altaya, No. 102
|-
|Mother-in-Law
|1912  
|Тёща  
|Zhizn Altaya, No. 212
|-
|A Man from the City
|1912 
|Человек из города  
|<small>Sibirskaya  Zhizn'"</small>
|-
|The Chapel
|1912  
|Часовня  
|Originally titled Na bogomolye (On Pilgrimage)
|-
|The Pretty One
|1913 
|Краля  
|Zavety, February 1913, originally as "Yevdokeya Ivanovna"
|-
|Vanka Khlyust
|1914 
|Ванька Хлюст  
|Ezhemesyachny Zhurnal (Monthly Journal), October 1914.  Included into the 1938 Blizzard collection
|-
|Magic Flower
|1915 
|Колдовской цветок 
|Otechestvo magazine, August 1915
|-
|Borodulin, the Cavalry Reconnaissance Officer
|1915 
|Конный разведчик Бородулин
|Otechestvo magazine, August 1915
|-
|Hasty Trial
|1916 
|Суд скорый  
|Written in Tomsk in 1914. First in the Sibirsky Skaz collection published by Ogni in Petrograd. Included into the 1938 Blizzard collection
|-
|Varya's Dream
|1916 
|Варин сон 
|Severnуe Zori (Northern Dawn) collection
|-
|Convict
|1916 
|Каторжник 
|Ezhemesyachny Zhurnal, No.1, 1917
|-
|Beaver Hat
|1917 
|Бобровая шапка 
|Shipovnik almanac, book 26.
|-
|Dear Mister
|1917 
|Дяденька 
|Shipovnik almanac, book 26.
|-
|Gold Means Grief
|1917 
|Золотая беда 
|Shipovnik almanac, book 26.
|-
|The Other Side
|1917 
|Та сторона 
|Severnoe Delo (Northern Cause) collection, Issie No.1. Included into the 1938 Blizzard  collection
|-
|The Provocateur. A True Story
|1918 
|Провокатор. Быль 
|Altayski Krestyanin (The Altai Peasant) magazine. Nos. 17-18
|-
|"Merican"
|1919 
|Мериканец 
|The Footing of the Tower collection. Written in 1918
|-
|"For Pastures New"
|1920 
|"На травку" 
|The Footing of the Tower collection. Written in 1918
|-
|Fearsome Kam
|1923 
|Страшный кам 
|Moskovski Almanac. Written in 1919. Based on a real life story of the lynching of an Altai shaman, kam.
|-
|The Exams
|1923 
|Экзамен 
|Drezina magazine, August issue
|-
|The Death of Tarelkin
|1923 
|Смерть Тарелкина 
|Prozhektor magazine, December 1923 issue. Included into the 1935 collection Shuteinye Rasskazy (Funny Stories)
|-
|The Show in the Ogryzov Village
|1923 
|Спектакль в селе Огрызово
|Krasnaya Nov, May issue
|-
|Ivan Puzikov, the Sherlock Holmes
|1923 
|Шерлок Холмс - Иван Пузиков
|Krasnaya Niva, October issue
|-
|Khrenovinka
|1923 
|Хреновинка (*)
|Krasny Voron, No.36. Included into the 1928 Kikimora collection. (*) Khrenovinka, literally "weird little thing", refers to the telephone the hero is greatly impressed with
|-
|Old Woman
|1924 
|Бабка
|Originally in the Show in the Ogryzov Village collection. Later included into the 1935 edition of Funny Stories
|-
|Cranes
|1924 
|Журавли 
|Krasny Zhurnal Dlya Vsekh, No.1, 1924
|-
|Fresh Breeze
|1924 
|Свежий ветер 
|Molodaya Gvardiya, No.1, 1924
|-
|The Ring
|1925 
|Кольцо 
|Krasnaya Nov, No.6
|-
|Divorce
|1926 
|Развод
|Originally in the Complete Works 1926 edition, vol.IX. Written in 1925.
|-
|"Nastyukha"
|1926 
|"Настюха"
|Originally in the Complete Works 1926 edition, vol.IX. Written in the same year. Later included into the 1935 edition of Funny Stories
|-
|Swimmers
|1926 
|Пловцы
|The Ring collection
|-
|Scarlet Snowdrifts
|1926 
|Алые сугробы 
|Krasnaya Nov, No.10, 1926
|-
|The Taiga Wolf
|1926 
|Таёжный волк 
|Novy Mir, No.11, under the original title "Baklanov"
|-
|The Beheading 
|1927 
|Усекновение
|The Beady Mug (Бисерная рожа) collection
|-
|Dikolche  
|1927 
|Дикольче
|
|-
|Greed
|1931 
|Алчность 
|Blizzard, 1931 collection. Written in 1927
|-
|Chertoznai
|1938 
|Чертознай 
|Literaturny Sovremenik magazine. Written in 1937 in Pushkin
|-
|We'll Sustain! 
|1942 
|Прокормим!
|October magazine, February issue
|-
|Guest from Siberia 
|1942 
|Гость из Сибири
|Krasnaya Zvezda newspaper, 1 November issue
|-
|Curious Occasion 
|1943 
|Любопытный случай
|Krasnoarmeyets newspaper, Nos. 17-18
|-
|Generous sacrifice 
|1943 
|Щедрая жертва
|Proud Family collection
|-
|The Susanins of the Soviet Land 
|1943 
|Сусанины советской земли
|Proud Family collection
|-
|Long Live Life
|1944 
|Да здравствует жизнь!
|The Collected Works by V.Y. Shishkov, 1960-1962, vol 3
|-
|Tempest 
|1944 
|Буря
|Krasnoarmeyets newspaper, No. 7
|-
|}

 Plays 

 Non-fiction
 On the Biya River (На Бии, 1914)
 True Tales of Chuisk (Чуйские были, 1914). Ezhemesyachny Zhurnal (Monthly Journal), April issue. Collection of essays and sketches. Included into the 1938 Blizzard collection
 With a Scrip On (С котомкой), Krasnaya Nov'', 1922, book 6; 1923, book 1. Set of traveller sketches

References

Bibliographies by writer
Bibliographies of Russian writers